Sophie Malbranque (born 24 December 1959) is a former French athlete, who specialised in the 400 meters.

Biography  
She won three French 400m championship titles, two outdoor in 1980 and 1981, and one indoor in 1981.

She participated in the 1980 Olympics in Moscow, where she was eliminated in the heats of the 400m.

prize list  
 French Championships in Athletics   :  
 2 times winner of the 400m 1980 and 1981   
 French Athletics Indoor Championships   :  
 winner of the 400 m in 1981

Records

References

External links  
  Docathlé2003, French Athletics Federation, 2003 p. 398   
  Olympic profile for Sophie Malbranque on sports-reference.com

1959 births
Athletes (track and field) at the 1980 Summer Olympics
French female sprinters
Olympic athletes of France
Universiade medalists in athletics (track and field)
Living people
Universiade bronze medalists for France
Medalists at the 1981 Summer Universiade
Olympic female sprinters
Sportspeople from Arras